This is a list of singles that reached number one on the Cash Box Top 100 chart during 1975.

See also
1975 in music
List of Hot 100 number-one singles of 1975 (U.S.)

References
http://www.cashboxmagazine.com/archives/70s_files/1975.html
http://musicseek.info/no1hits/1975.htm

1975 record charts
1975
1975 in American music